Gymnastic Athletic Club Ialysos Rhodes 1948 is a Greek professional football club based in Ialysos, Dodecanese, Greece. The club was founded in 1948.

History
The club was originally founded in 1925, during which the Dodecanese belonged to the Kingdom of Italy. GAS Ialyssos was officially established in 1948, during which the Dodecanese arrived in the Kingdom of Greece.

In 1992–93, the team won the first place in its group, in the National Division IV, thus winning the promotion to the National Division III. In the following period, 1993–94, they joined the 1st Group finishing second with 67 points, leading to the promotion to 2nd National. During the period 1994–95, they made an impressive run, finishing 3rd with 57 points, 2 points behind Kalamata, losing briefly to the country's top division.

The 1995–96 season was not commensurate, as the team experienced the relegation, finishing 15th with 44 points, 1 point behind Panargiakos, just below the relegation zone. After two seasons in the 3rd National, in 1998, the team returned to the 2nd National Division to return to the 2nd National two seasons later, in 2000. Within a year, the team found itself in the 4th National, after 8 seasons. The following season, they were relegated to the local EPS Championships. Dodecanese.

In 2004, Ialysos returned to the Delta Ethniki to return to the local division again in 2007. In 2009, they returned to the National Division for a year and again relegated to the local championships. In 2010, it was announced the merger of the team with "AS". Rhodes Island Revival ”, creating the“ GAS ” Renaissance / Ialyssos ”. A year later, in 2011, it was renamed "GAS". Ialyssos 1948 ".

In the 2014–15 season, Ialysos won the First Division of the USSR event which gave him the right to compete in the EPS Championships. 2015, taking part in the 11th Group where it took the first place, thus gaining promotion to the 3rd National Amateur category.

Players

Current squad

Honours

Domestic

League titles
 Third Division   
 Winners (2): 1997–98, 2018–19
 Fourth Division   
 Winners (1): 1992–93
 Dodecanese FCA Championship (Local Championship)   
 Winners (7): 1964–65, 1981–82, 2003–04, 2008–09, 2013–14, 2014–15, 2021-22

Cups
 Dodecanese FCA Cup (Local Cup)   
 Winners (3): 1957–58, 1977–78, 2014–15

External links

 
Rhodes (city)
Football clubs in South Aegean
Sport in Rhodes
Gamma Ethniki clubs